Orlovka or Kolonija (Siberian Finnish: Orunkylä) is a village 140 km east of Omsk in Novosibirsk Oblast , Russia. Orlovka has a large Siberian Finnish minority. The village is inhabited by Estonians, Siberian Finns, Kazakhs and Russians. Orlovka is still a big village that is 2 km wide.

References 

Rural localities in Novosibirsk Oblast